Hafdar may refer to:
 Hafdar, Yazd
 Hafdar Rural District, in Semnan Province